Palpita seminigralis is a moth in the family Crambidae. It was described by George Hampson in 1899. It is found in Cameroon, the Democratic Republic of the Congo (Kasai-Occidental, Équateur) and Nigeria.

References

Moths described in 1899
Palpita
Moths of Africa